Mount Allo is a conspicuous conical, snow-covered peak, 285 m in height, which rises from Neyt Point on Kran Peninsula at the northeast end of Liege Island, in the Palmer Archipelago. Discovered by the Belgian Antarctic Expedition, 1897–99, and named after M. Allo, Director General de la Marine at Anvers (Antwerp).

See also
List of Antarctic expeditions

Mountains of the Palmer Archipelago
Liège Island